The 2017 Colonial Square Ladies Classic was held from September 22 to 25 at the Nutana Curling Club in Saskatoon, Saskatchewan, as part of the 2017–18 World Curling Tour. The event was in a Triple Knockout format.

Teams
The teams are listed as follows:

Knockout Draw Brackets
The draw is listed as follows:

A Event

B Event

C Event

Playoffs

References

External links

2017 in Canadian curling
September 2017 sports events in Canada
2017 in Saskatchewan
Curling in Saskatoon